Kim Young-gwon (born 27 February 1990) is a South Korean professional footballer who plays for Ulsan Hyundai and the South Korea national football team.

Early life
Kim is a native of Jeonju. When he was in middle school, he was not a highly-regarded prospect as coaches viewed his slight frame as a disadvantage. Kim began considering becoming a professional footballer when national youth team manager Hong Myung-bo visited Kim's high school to speak to his team.

Kim played college football and futsal for Jeonju University. In 2009, he participated in the Futsal League of the Korea Football Association, and became the champion and the top scorer. His futsal career was a big help to his techniques.

Club career
In 2010, Kim joined J1 League side FC Tokyo, starting his professional career. He scored his first senior goal with a direct free kick in the 2010 J.League Cup against Kyoto Sanga FC. After his first season, Kim transferred to Omiya Ardija, because FC Tokyo was relegated to the second tier by finishing 16th in the league.

In July 2012, Kim transferred to Chinese Super League side Guangzhou Evergrande. He contributed to the best period of Guangzhou Evergrande, showing foreign player's worth. Guangzhou Evergrande won all of the four league titles in addition to two AFC Champions Leagues during the initial four years with Kim, (2013–2016) and Kim was also selected for the Team of the Year every year. However, he lost his influence in Guangzhou due to his injury and the removal of Asian quota in the CSL since 2017.

International career
Kim's first international tournament was the Universiade. He played the 2009 Summer Universiade for South Korean Universiade team.

In the 2009 FIFA U-20 World Cup, Kim was the regular center defender of South Korean under-20 team, and scored a goal during the last group match against the United States, which resulted South Korea's advancing to the knockout stage.

Kim also played the 2009 Asian Indoor Games for the South Korea national futsal team.

Kim won the bronze medal with South Korean under-23 team in the 2010 Asian Games. Afterwards, he was named in the primary list for the 2011 AFC Asian Cup, but he wasn't selected for the final squad.

In the 2012 Summer Olympics, South Korean Olympic football team finished third, winning its first-ever Olympic football medal. Kim was regarded as a notable player among the bronze medalists.

Kim was a member of South Korea's squad for the 2014 FIFA World Cup and started in all of the team's group matches. South Korea drew with Russia, and lost to Algeria and Belgium in the group stage. His defense wasn't good this time, especially against Algerian players.

At the 2015 AFC Asian Cup, Kim scored the second goal in South Korea's 2–0 semi-final defeat of Iraq on 26 January 2015, putting the nation into the Asian Cup final for the first time since 1988. However, South Korea failed to bring the trophy after losing the final to Australia.

Kim was named in South Korea's squad for the 2018 FIFA World Cup in Russia. He showed outstanding plays unlike four years ago, becoming a great leader of South Korean defenders. Furthermore, in the final group match against Germany, he scored in the 91st minute to knock out the defending world champions, coupled with a second goal minutes later by Son Heung-min.

In the 2022 FIFA World Cup, Kim scored a goal in South Korea's crucial match against Portugal to level the score 1–1, followed by Hwang Hee-chan's goal in stoppage time, which promoted South Korea to the round of 16. In the round of 16, Kim played his 100th cap for the national team against Brazil, with Korea going on to lose 4-1.

Personal life
In 2014 Kim married Park Se-jin. They have three children, a daughter and two sons. Kim has made guest appearances with his two older children in several episodes of The Return of Superman.

Career statistics

Club

International

Honours
Jeonju University
 Korean FA Futsal League: 2009

Guangzhou Evergrande
 Chinese Super League: 2012, 2013, 2014, 2015, 2016, 2017
 Chinese FA Cup: 2012, 2016
 Chinese FA Super Cup: 2016
 AFC Champions League: 2013, 2015

Gamba Osaka
Emperor's Cup runner-up: 2020

Ulsan Hyundai
 K League 1: 2022

South Korea U23
 Summer Olympics bronze medal: 2012
 Asian Games bronze medal: 2010

South Korea
 AFC Asian Cup runner-up: 2015
 EAFF Championship: 2015, 2019

Individual
 Korean FA Futsal League top goalscorer: 2009
 Chinese Super League Team of the Year: 2013, 2014, 2015, 2016
 EAFF Championship Best Defender: 2015
 AFC Champions League Dream Team: 2015
 Korean FA Player of the Year: 2015
 J1 League Fans' Best XI: 2020
 K League 1 Best XI: 2022

References

External links
Kim Young-gwon – National Team Stats at KFA 

1990 births
Living people
People from Jeonju
Association football defenders
South Korean footballers
South Korea under-20 international footballers
South Korea under-23 international footballers
South Korea international footballers
FC Tokyo players
Omiya Ardija players
Guangzhou F.C. players
Gamba Osaka players
J1 League players
Chinese Super League players
South Korean expatriate footballers
South Korean expatriate sportspeople in Japan
Expatriate footballers in Japan
South Korean expatriate sportspeople in China
Expatriate footballers in China
Olympic footballers of South Korea
Olympic medalists in football
Olympic bronze medalists for South Korea
Footballers at the 2010 Asian Games
Medalists at the 2010 Asian Games
Footballers at the 2012 Summer Olympics
Medalists at the 2012 Summer Olympics
2014 FIFA World Cup players
2015 AFC Asian Cup players
2018 FIFA World Cup players
2019 AFC Asian Cup players
Asian Games medalists in football
Asian Games bronze medalists for South Korea
Sportspeople from North Jeolla Province
2022 FIFA World Cup players